Boloponera is a genus of small ants in the subfamily Ponerinae. The genus contains the single species Boloponera vicans, known from a single worker specimen collected in leaf litter in the Central African Republic. It is sometimes referred to as Bry's Ant after its discoverer, Brian Fisher.

Description
The worker specimen is small (3.3 mm) and orange in color. It has linear mandibles, with two small teeth. Nothing is known about its biology, but the linear mandibles suggest that the ants are specialized predators.

References

External links

Endemic fauna of the Central African Republic
Ponerinae
Monotypic ant genera
Hymenoptera of Africa